I Love 'Em All is the eighth studio album by American country music artist T. G. Sheppard. It was released in 1981 via Warner Bros. and Curb Records. The album includes the singles "I Loved 'Em Every One" and "Party Time".

Track listing

Chart performance

References

1981 albums
T. G. Sheppard albums
Warner Records albums
Curb Records albums